"Anicyka Maya" is a single by Romanian singer Anna Lesko.  It was released in Romania, Moldova, Ukraine, Russia, Armenia, Georgia, Belarus, Lithuania, Latvia, Estonia and New Zealand.

The single achieved considerable success, reaching the number 2 position on the Romanian Top 100.

Chart position

Track listing 
Anicyka Maya (3:15)
Ispita (3:00)
Nu mă Uita (3:55)
Prima Oară (2:58)
Tot Aşa (3:02)

References

Anna Lesko songs
2006 songs